Arthur Cunningham (born Piermont, New York on November 11, 1928, died Nyack, New York on March 31, 1997) was an American composer and educator. His students included singer Kate Davidson, producer/engineer Peter Francovilla, and pianist John Ellis.

Biography
Cunningham began writing music at the age of 12 to be performed with his jazz band. He attended Fisk University (BA 1951), Juilliard, (1951–1952) and Columbia University's Teachers College, attaining his Master's in 1957. The National Association of Negro Musicians gave a concert of his works in 1951. Cunningham served in the United States Army from 1955 to 1957 and wrote music for army bands, as well as for television.

Cunningham wrote seven large-scale works for the stage between 1963 and 1973, mixing many styles of popular music including jazz, gospel and rock. Some of his words are similar to, and predate, rock opera.

Stage works
Patsy Patch and Susan’s Dream (rock musical for children; libretto by Cunningham; first performance Orangeburg, New York, 27 April 1963)
The Beauty Part (musical show with improvised piano accompaniment; libretto by S. J. Perelman; first performance Blauvelt, New York, at Rockland County Playhouse, 13 Aug 1963)
Violetta, 1963 (musical, based upon J. Audiberti's Le mal court)
Ostrich Feathers (rock musical play for children; libretto by B. Brenner; first performance New York, Martinique Theatre, 16 Nov 1965)
Concentrics, an orchestral piece commissioned and premiered by the Symphony of the New World on February 2, 1969, at Philharmonic Hall, Lincoln Center 
His Natural Grace, 1969 (rock opera, libretto by Cunningham)
Night Song, 1973 (theatre piece, unperformed. Texts in Swahili, Gullah, and English)
House by the Sea (libretto by Cunningham; incomplete)

References

Wright, Josephine. "Cunningham, Arthur". The New Grove Dictionary of Opera.
Kozinn, Allan. "Arthur Cunningham, Jazz Pianist and Roving Composer, Dies at 68". The New York Times, April 3, 1997.

1928 births
1997 deaths
African-American classical composers
American classical composers
African-American male classical composers
American male classical composers
People from Piermont, New York
20th-century classical musicians
20th-century classical composers
20th-century American composers
20th-century American male musicians
Juilliard School alumni
Fisk University alumni
Teachers College, Columbia University alumni
United States Army soldiers
United States military musicians
20th-century African-American musicians